The Imi-n-Ifri Formation is a Sinemurian geologic formation outcropping about  from Demnate, to the east of Marrakech, Morocco. Fossil ornithopod tracks have been reported from the formation.

Description 
The formation comprises limestones and dolomites deposited in shallow depth of water, low-energy, marine or lagoonal to supratidal environments. The top of the carbonate sequence is marked by a bench of yellow 'cargneule' capped by a hardground.

See also 
 List of dinosaur-bearing rock formations
 List of stratigraphic units with ornithischian tracks
 Ornithopod tracks

References

Bibliography

Further reading 
 M. Monbaron, J. Dejax, and G. Demathieu. 1985. Longues pistes de Dinosaures bipèdes à Adrar-n-Ouglagal (Maroc) et répartition des faunes de grands Reptiles dans le domaine atlasique au cours du Mésozoïque. Bulletin du Muséum National D'Histoire Naturelle, 4e série, section A 7(3):229-242

Geologic formations of Morocco
Jurassic System of Africa
Jurassic Morocco
Sinemurian Stage
Limestone formations
Dolomite formations
Ichnofossiliferous formations
Paleontology in Morocco